Pla Khao is a tambon (subdistrict) of Mueang Amnat Charoen District, in Amnat Charoen Province, Thailand. In 2016 it had a total population of 5,682 people.

Administration

Central administration
The tambon is subdivided into 12 administrative villages (muban).

Local administration
The whole area of the subdistrict is covered by the subdistrict administrative organization (SAO) Pla Khao (องค์การบริหารส่วนตำบลปลาค้าว).

References

External links
Thaitambon.com on Pla Khao

Pla Khao
Populated places in Amnat Charoen province